Elfyn is a Welsh name and may refer to:

Given name:
Elfyn Edwards (born 1960), Welsh former professional footballer
Elfyn Evans (born 1988), Welsh rally driver
Elfyn Lewis (born 1969), Welsh painter and National Eisteddfod of Wales Gold Medallist
Elfyn Llwyd (born 1951), Welsh barrister and politician
Elfyn Richards (1914–1995), Welsh professor, aeronautical engineer and acoustical engineer

Surname:
Beli ap Elfyn, Welsh for Beli II of Alt Clut (died 722), 8th century king of Strathclyde
Bethan Elfyn, Welsh radio and television presenter
Menna Elfyn FRSL FLSW (born 1952), Welsh poet, playwright, columnist writing in Welsh